Modulus ambiguus is a species of sea snail, a marine gastropod mollusk in the family Modulidae.

Description

Distribution

References

Modulidae
Gastropods described in 1912